Ron McKinven (born 8 January 1936) is a Scottish former professional footballer who played as a wing half, making over 250 appearances in the Scottish Football League.

Career

Club career
McKinven played in the Scottish Football League for Queen's Park, Stirling Albion and St Johnstone.

International career
McKinven represented Great Britain at the 1960 Summer Olympics.

Later life
He later became an interior designer.

References

1936 births
Living people
Scottish footballers
Queen's Park F.C. players
Stirling Albion F.C. players
St Johnstone F.C. players
Scottish Football League players
Association football wing halves
Footballers at the 1960 Summer Olympics
Olympic footballers of Great Britain
Scotland amateur international footballers